Herophila tristis is a species of beetle in the family Cerambycidae, they are also called longhorned beetles. It was described by Carl Linnaeus in 1767, originally under the genus Cerambyx. It is known from Italy, Romania, Austria, Bulgaria, Crete, Croatia, Sardinia, France, Greece, Serbia, Corsica, Sicily, Hungary, Slovenia, Albania, and Turkey. It feeds on Morus alba, Ficus carica, and Robinia pseudoacacia. They  live 2-3 years and are 13 - 26 mm long. Larvae feed under the bark of a range of broad-leaved trees, mostly Ficus carica commonly known as fig trees. As an adult they hide in the day and come out in the dusk.

Subspecies
 Herophila tristis martinascoi (Contarini & Garagnani, 1983)
 Herophila tristis tristis (Linnaeus, 1767)

References

Phrissomini
Beetles described in 1767
Taxa named by Carl Linnaeus